The Drop-In was a podcast hosted by Will Malnati. In each episode, Malnati has a candid conversation with an interesting person in popular culture or leader in entertainment, hospitality and business. Guests have included Chris Hardwick (CEO at Nerdist Industries), Sebastian Stan (Captain America: Civil War), and Nico Tortorella (Younger).

Episodes

{| class="wikitable"
|-
! # !! Title !! Description !! Released
|-
| 1 || Matt McGorry || Actor Matt McGorry (Orange is the New Black, How to Get Away with Murder) drops in to chat with Will about learning to drive at 28-years-old, camping, flexing his ass on TV, paparazzi and his social media skills. || March 21, 2016
|-
| 2 || Taylor Kitsch || Actor Taylor Kitsch (True Detective, Lone Survivor) drops-in to chat with Will about photography, focus, success, laziness, social media, charity and emergency landings.  || March 21, 2016
|-
| 3 || Brian Baumgartner || Actor Brian Baumgartner (The Office) drops-in to chat with Will about singing in the high school choir, his friend "Michael Jordan" and people who annoy him. || March 28, 2016
|-
| 4 || Paul Wesley, Pt. 1 || In Part 1 of 2 with Paul Wesley, Will speaks with the actor about his perceived arrogance, mental therapy, directing, and lack of a daily routine. || April 6, 2016
|-
| 5 || Paul Wesley, Pt. 2|| In Part 2, Paul tells Will about the times that he has seen ghosts, how he got kicked out of school, and how he transitioned into acting full-time. || April 12, 2016
|-
| 6 || Steve Levitan || Will speaks with Modern Family creator Steve Levitan about being a boss, Midwest values, balance, tequila and Yelpers and Twitter'ers suck.|| April 21, 2016
|-
| 7 || Anne Burrell || Will speaks with chef and TV host Anne Burrell about becoming a chef, sleeping in late and why emotions are heightened while on a plane.|| April 28, 2016
|-
| 8 || Sebastian Stan, Pt. 1 || On the eve of the US release of Captain America: Civil War, Will speaks with actor Sebastian Stan about managing relationships surrounding a massive premiere, growing up in a conservative home and the type of Uber driver he would be.|| May 5, 2016
|-
| 9 || Sebastian Stan, Pt. 2 || In Part 2 of Will's interview with Sebastian Stan, they talk about "first" experiences, Uber drivers for Trump and how Sebastian changed the Happy Meal forever.|| May 12, 2016
|-
| 10 || Nico Tortorella, Pt. 1|| Nico speaks with Will about getting sober, his experience in high school and how he went from being a really really ridiculously good-looking model to bring a really really ridiculously good-looking actor. || May 20, 2016
|-
| 11 || Evan Peters || On the eve of the U.S. release of his new blockbuster film X-Men: Apocalypse, Evan Peters (American Horror Story) speaks about rap remixes of Adele songs, why he is annoyed by lap-napkins at restaurants, how to lose weight fast and what he learned on the set of X-Men. || May 26, 2016
|-
| 12 || Nico Tortorella, Pt. 2 || In Part 2, Nico talks sexuality, becoming friends with police officers and why he has the nickname "The Hurricane." || June 2, 2016
|-
| 13 || Rob Iler, Pt. 1  || On the eve of the 9th Anniversary of The Sopranos''' historic series finale, Will speaks with the shows' star Rob Iler about the dentist, how much money he makes from The Sopranos today and why he likes getting his haircut in the bathtub. || June 9, 2016
|-
| 14 || Rob Iler, Pt. 2  || Rob talks about why he hates House of Cards, why he loves Howard Stern and why he is weird about bathroom attendants. He also does some amazing impressions.|| June 16, 2016
|-
| 15 || Chris Hardwick || Chris raps the Ten Podcast Commandments and gives Will other lessons in podcasting and/or life.  || June 22, 2016
|-
| 16 || Jenna Ushkowitz || Jenna Ushkowitz of Fox's hit TV show Glee chats with Will about not having "the talk" with her parents, throwing mirrors at the wall to get her way and losing a castmate.  || July 1, 2016
|-
| 17 || Chace Crawford || Chace Crawford drops in to do his best impression of Scott Stapp of the band Creed, getting arrested, what he misses about Gossip Girl and his new project coming out next week "Undrafted"  || July 7, 2016
|-
| 18 || Joseph Mazzello || In the Season 1 finale, Joe Mazzello talks about his fear of coming out of the lactose-intolerant closet, why he doesn't answer Harrison Ford's calls anymore and why he owes everything to Macaulay Culkin. Joe makes his directorial debut with "Undrafted" which hits theaters and iTunes today.   || July 15, 2016
|}

FormatThe Drop-In'' features extended candid interviews with host Will Malnati and public figures in entertainment, business and hospitality. As a result of the intimate nature of the show's interviews, guests have opened up about previously private personal information for the first time in a public setting. Examples include Sebastian Stan's story about losing his virginity, and Nico Tortorella's disclosure of being sexually "label-less."

References

External links
 The Drop-In At Will Radio

Audio podcasts
2016 podcast debuts
2017 podcast endings